Cape Dory is the debut studio album by American indie pop band Tennis, released on January 18, 2011, on Fat Possum Records.

Critical reception

Cape Dory was generally well received. At Metacritic, which assigns a normalized rating out of 100 to reviews from mainstream critics, the album received an average score of 76, based on 24 reviews, which indicates "generally favorable reviews".
Cape Dory was listed at number five on Spinner's 40 Best Albums of 2011. No Ripcord placed the album at number 41 on its of Top 50 Albums of 2011, commenting that "for a brief thirty minutes, [Patrick] Riley and [Alania] Moore opt to share a reliable set of savory pop nostalgia."

Track listing

Charts

References

2011 debut albums
Fat Possum Records albums
Tennis (band) albums